Raphia regalis is a species of flowering plant in the family Arecaceae. It is found in Angola, Cameroon, Republic of the Congo, Gabon, and Nigeria. Its natural habitat is subtropical or tropical moist lowland forests. It is threatened by habitat loss.

References

regalis
Flora of West Tropical Africa
Flora of Angola
Vulnerable flora of Africa
Taxa named by Odoardo Beccari
Taxonomy articles created by Polbot